Benfica Stars Fund was a football investment fund belonging to Portuguese club Benfica's SAD, a public limited sports company responsible for the financial management of the club's professional football team.

The fund was set up by ESAF – Espírito Santo Fundos de Investimento Mobiliário SA on 30 September 2009. At first the fund had 8,000,000 unit each with €5 each.

History
Benfica Stars Fund was the fourth investment fund of Portuguese football, after First Portuguese Football Players Funds in the 2000s. Moreover, Benfica was the last of the "Big Three" clubs in Portugal to set-up an investment fund. The club sold part of the economic rights of 12 players to the fund, in exchange for cash. If Benfica sold the players, Benfica would give back a percentage of transfer fees received to the fund. In October 2009, S.L. Benfica SAD invested €6 million to the fund, accounted for 15% of total units. The club then sold more players to the fund, made the subscription, in turn became an injection of asset instead of cash.

After the sale of David Luiz in January and Fábio Coentrão in summer 2011, the fund acquired five players from Benfica instead of keeping cash for €6.135 million.

As an asset, the rights were amortized proportionally according to the length of contract (between players and club). Moreover, the fund also bore the admission fee related to player transaction, tax arose, agent fee and FIFA solidarity mechanism (5% of transfer fee distributed to youth clubs) proportionality to the ownership ratio. Thus, to make the fund profitable, the club had to sell the player above the fee that the fund acquired. The club had to ask the fund if the club had to sell the player below the reference price of the fund.

On 31 July 2014, Benfica SAD (which owned 15%) completed the acquisition of Benfica Stars Fund by spending around €28.9 million for 85% (decreased from €34 million in 2009), purchasing the remaining economic rights of nine players (with a valuation of €5,079,437), as well as €21,704,300 deposits and future receivable from bonus clauses.

Investments

See also
 Third-party ownership in association football

References

External links
 Benfica Stars Fund reports at CMVM 

Association football organizations
S.L. Benfica